Rioja is a municipality of Almería province, in the autonomous community of Andalusia, Spain. It should not be confused with La Rioja (autonomous community) in the north, known for its distinctive wine.

Demographics

References

External links
  Rioja - Sistema de Información Multiterritorial de Andalucía
  Rioja - Diputación Provincial de Almería

Municipalities in the Province of Almería